The Alexandrit class, Russian designation Project 12700 Aleksandrit (for the mineral alexandrite), is the newest class of Russian minesweepers designed by Almaz and being built by the Sredne-Nevsky Shipyard for the Russian Navy. The first ship was laid down on 22 September 2011 and was launched in June 2014. Anywhere between 30 and 50+ ships have been described as envisaged.

History 
The lead ship of the class, Aleksandr Obukhov, was laid down on 22 September 2011 during a keel-laying ceremony at the Sredne-Nevsky Shipyard in Saint Petersburg. Originally, the ship was planned to be launched in 2012 and commissioned in 2015, but the deadlines were postponed several times due to the international sanctions imposed against Russia and due to French refusal to deliver necessary equipment for completion of the vessel, namely the mine search system.

In July 2015, Aleksandr Obukhov was transferred to Kronstadt to begin its sea trials in the Baltic Sea. It took part in the 2015 Navy parade but had to be later towed back to Sredne-Nevsky Shipyard for further retrofitting. It was again transferred to Kronstadt on 2 December 2015 and its sea trials began on 29 April 2016. The ship was accepted into service on 9 December 2016.

According to the shipyard's representatives the first hull was shaped within one and one-half days, making it a world record.

In March 2015, Russian Navy's Deputy Commander-in-Chief Vice-Admiral Viktor Bursuk stated there are plans to supply the Navy with about 10 project 12700 vessels by 2025, and up to 30 by 2050.

The second ship, the first serial one, Georgiy Kurbatov, was laid down on 24 April 2015.

On 7 June 2016, hull of the second ship was damaged by fire while it was under construction. According to shipyard officials, this would not affect the construction time, however, the launch date was later postponed.

On 9 December 2016, Russian Navy's Commander-in-Chief Vladimir Korolyov reported, a contract was signed for construction of seven more project 12700 vessels with a total of 40 planned.

On 9 June 2017, the Russian Defence Ministry announced first two vessels, out of the 40 planned, will be delivered to the Navy in 2018. Further it was reported the Srdne-Nevskiy Shipyard in Saint Petersburg would build two ships per year. A total of 11 vessels has so far been ordered. 1 more ordered in August 2021.

Design 
The main feature of project 12700 is a monolithic fibreglass hull shaped by vacuum infusion, a modern construction method which results in a lighter hull with a longer service life. The ships of the class are designed to use various flails, as well as tele-guided and autonomous unmanned underwater vehicles and unmanned surface vehicles to disable or destroy mines at safe distances.

Export 
India has shown interest in the minesweeper and has been in talks about starting producing the ship under licence. India would require at least ten ships. In September 2016 talks were suspended as the Indian delegation awaits the results of the operational evaluation of the first Russian ship.

On 9 June 2017, Russian Navy Deputy Commander Vice-Admiral Viktor Bursuk stated there were plans for the construction of additional ships at shipyards in East Asia. It is unclear if he was referring to shipyards in the Russian Far East or in other countries situated in East Asia.

Ships

Italics indicate estimates

See also
List of ships of the Soviet Navy
List of ships of Russia by project number

References

External links 
Project 12700 - Complete Ship List

Mine warfare vessel classes
Minesweepers of the Russian Navy